Gérard Caron (2 April 1916, in St-Martin-de-Beauce, Quebec – 19 January 1986, in Montreal) was a Canadian organist and pianist. He studied at the Conservatoire national de musique, the Université de Montréal, the Accademia Musicale Chigiana in Sienna, Italy, and privately with Fernando Germani in Rome. He held organist posts at several notable cathedrals, including Notre-Dame-des-Victoires, Quebec City, Saint-Jean-Berchmans Church, the French church of St Vincent de Paul in New York City, St. Patrick's Cathedral in Manhattan, and St. Jean Baptiste Catholic Church in New York. He also performed as a concert pianist and organist throughout North America, and in Florence, Turin, and Rome. He also served as the regular accompanist for singers Pierrette Alarie and Léopold Simoneau.

References

1916 births
1986 deaths
Accademia Musicale Chigiana alumni
Canadian organists
Male organists
Conservatoire national de musique alumni
Musicians from Quebec
Université de Montréal alumni
People from Chaudière-Appalaches
20th-century Canadian pianists
20th-century organists
20th-century Canadian male musicians